The Queen Elizabeth II Reservoir lies to the south of the River Thames and to the west of the Island Barn Reservoir. To the north are the Bessborough and Knight reservoirs. The A3050 runs to the north of the reservoir and it is situated in Walton on Thames. It is managed by Thames Water.

History 
The reservoir was authorised by the Metropolitan Water Board Act 1935 (25 & 26 Geo. 5. c. lxxxiv). Excavation work on the reservoir started in 1936 under the supervision of the Board's chief engineer Jonathan Davidson but was suspended upon the outbreak of war in 1939. Work only recommenced in 1957 and was undertaken by W. & C. French. The reservoir was completed in 1962 and was formally opened by the Queen on 30 March 1962.

Construction 
The reservoir embankment has a rolled clay core which extends down into the under-lying blue London clay. The clay was taken from three borrow pits. The reservoir walls were constructed by dragging gravel from the floor of the reservoir but which was not compacted other than compaction by the construction machinery. A study in 2009 identified that about 750,000 tonnes of sand and gravel could be excavated from the bottom of the reservoir.

The inlet and outlet valve towers are located at the north east and north west corners of the reservoir.

Ownership 
The Metropolitan Water Board operated the reservoir until the Board was abolished in 1974 under the provisions of the Water Act 1973 (c. 37) ownership and control was transferred to the Thames Water Authority. Under the provisions of the Water Act 1989 (c. 15) the Thames Water Authority was privatised as Thames Water.

Dimensions 

Environment 
Bewick's swans have been spotted on this reservoir. In the winter of 1963 100,000 gulls were counted roosting at the reservoir. Little auks, red-necked phalarope, Bonaparte's gulls, roseate terns, pomarine skuas and shore larks have also been spotted at this reservoir. As of 2020 Thames Water are reviewing the access arrangements for all three of the Walton reservoirs, The design of the reservoir has an effect on the fish population that can live in the reservoir, the concrete shores means that only European perch and ruffe can breed, except for where there are empty fish cages constructed with netting, which support some plant growth and this allows small numbers of cyprinid fish to breed. The low numbers of fish in the reservoir have led to the zooplankton being dominated by large-sized water fleas and Daphnia and to high growth rates in the few fish that live there. No fishing is permitted at the reservoir.

Solar panels 
In March 2016 Thames Water commissioned a farm of solar panels on the reservoir which at the time was the world's largest floating solar farm. It consists of over 23,000 panels covering one tenth of the reservoir's surface. generating 6.3 MW of power, enough to power approximately 1,800 homes. The solar farm is expected to offset Thames Water's energy expenses used to power their nearby water treatment and pumping stations.

See also
London water supply infrastructure

References

External links
Picture

Reservoirs in Surrey
Borough of Elmbridge
Thames Water reservoirs
Drinking water reservoirs in England